The Cladova is a right tributary of the river Mureș in Romania. It discharges into the Mureș near Radna.

References

Rivers of Romania
Rivers of Arad County